Stewart I. Donaldson, Ph.D. is a British-born American positive psychologist specializing in health, well-being, and evaluation science. He is a distinguished university professor at Claremont Graduate University and is the director of the Claremont Evaluation Center and The Evaluators' Institute. He also served as dean at Claremont for 16 years (2001-2017) and as president of the American Evaluation Association in 2015.

Career
Donaldson is now a distinguished university professor in the Schools of Social Science, Policy & Evaluation and Community and Global Health at Claremont Graduate University, and he also serves as the executive director of the Claremont Evaluation Center and The Evaluators Institute.  In 2015, he served as president of the American Evaluation Association.

Books
Donaldson has pubished more than 130 peer-reviewed articles and chapters on the science and practice of positive psychology, well-being, positive organizational psychology, program design and evaluation, and has published or has forthcoming more than 20 scholarly books, including

Personal life
Donaldson is a naturalized US citizen who has lived in California.

See also
List of Claremont Graduate University people

References

External links
 Stewart I. Donaldson & Associates
 Faculty page at Claremont Graduate University
 Claremont Evaluation Center
 The Evaluators Institute (TEI)
 Dr. Donaldson at SAGE Publications

British psychologists
Organizational psychologists
People from West Bromwich
Positive psychologists
Living people
Year of birth missing (living people)